Auchendinny railway station was a station which served Auchendinny, in the Scottish county of Midlothian. It was served by trains on the branch line that terminated at Penicuik.

History
Opened by the Penicuik Railway, then run by the North British Railway, it became part of the London and North Eastern Railway during the Grouping of 1923. The line then passed on to the Scottish Region of British Railways on nationalisation in 1948, only to be closed by British Railways three years later.

The site today
The platform is still there although overgrown and the station building is a dwelling house.

References

External links
 Station on navigable O.S. map
 Picture of Station.

Former North British Railway stations
Disused railway stations in Midlothian
Railway stations in Great Britain opened in 1872
Railway stations in Great Britain closed in 1951
Penicuik